Absorber is the second studio album by the German techno and electro project of the Munich-based DJ and producer Florian Senfter a.k.a. Zombie Nation. It was released on September 1, 2003 on his self-founded record label, Dekathlon Records.

Track listing 
All tracks by Splank! except where noted.
 
CD
 "Souls At Zero" – 5:14 
 "Chowpatty Slices" – 5:05
 "Mr. Sunbeam" – 3:52
 "Cycles To Failure" – 5:36
 "Push" – 4:37 
 "Tape Me" – 4:35
 "Automatic Gestalt" – 4:47 
 "Stricken" – 5:00
 "The Cut" (featuring My Robot Friend) (My Robot Friend, Splank!) – 4:35
 "Redefine" – 5:26
 "Crystal Six" – 5:36
 "Inside The Speaker" – 4:35
 "Slack Wax" – 5:19

Vinyl
 A1 Souls At Zero
 A2 Redefine
 A3 Mr. Sunbeam
 B1 The Cut (featuring My Robot Friend)
 B2 Inside The Speaker
 B3 Cycles To Failure
 C1 Push
 C2 Tape Me
 C3 Crystal Six
 D1 Chowpatty Slices
 D2 Stricken
 D3 Automatic Gestalt

Singles 
 Souls At Zero (2003)
 The Cut (2003)

Personnel 
Lola Amorez – artwork
Ilja Coric – guitar
Thomas Korge – mastering
My Robot Friend – vocals
Splank! – Vocals, producer
Tineke Weber – photography

External links 
 Official Website from Zombie Nation
 Official Website of Dekathlon Records
 

Zombie Nation (band) albums
2003 albums
Techno albums by German artists